'Beauty of Kent' is a cultivar of apples; the fruit are used for cooking. It is known by various names including 'Countess of Warwick', 'Gadd's Seedling', and 'Wooling's Favourite'. It received an Award of Merit from the Royal Horticultural Society in 1901 but was judged of no value for the apple-growing areas of New York State in 1913. Vitamin C 12mg/100g.

References

Apple cultivars
British apples
Cooking apples